Brad L. Hansen (born October 30, 1968) is an American politician in the state of Iowa.

Hansen was born in Onawa, Iowa. He attended University of Iowa and is a businessman. A Republican, he served in the Iowa House of Representatives from 1997 to 2003 (83rd district and briefly the 100th district in 2003).

References

1968 births
Living people
People from Monona County, Iowa
University of Iowa alumni
Businesspeople from Iowa
Republican Party members of the Iowa House of Representatives